Sokoleč is a municipality and village in Nymburk District in the Central Bohemian Region of the Czech Republic. It has about 1,100 inhabitants.

Trivia
The municipality lies entirely within the Velim railway test circuit.

References

Villages in Nymburk District